Allochrostes is a genus of moths in the family Geometridae described by Prout in 1912.

Species
The species include:
 Allochrostes biornata
 Allochrostes imperfecta
 Allochrostes impunctata
 Allochrostes rubridentata
 Allochrostes saliata
 Allochrostes uniornata

Geometrinae
Geometridae genera